Tommy Tiernan (born 16 June 1969) is an Irish comedian, actor, and writer. He is best known for his stand-up career, hosting The Tommy Tiernan Show (2017–present) and playing Gerry in the sitcom Derry Girls (2018–2022).

Early life
Tiernan was born in Carndonagh on 16 June 1969, the son of a mother from County Limerick and a father from County Kerry. He moved with his family as a child; after spells living in London and Zambia, he attended the Catholic ex-junior seminary St Patrick's Classical School in Navan, where his schoolmates included Hector Ó hEochagáin and Dylan Moran. He later attended the boarding school Garbally College in Ballinasloe.

Career
Tiernan has appeared several times on The Late Late Show. In the United States, he has appeared several times on the Late Show with David Letterman. He has also appeared on Michael McIntyre's Comedy Roadshow, The Lee Mack Show, Dave's One Night Stand, QI, and joined Eddie Izzard and Ross Noble at Laughs in the Park.

In "Going to America", the final episode of the clerical sitcom Father Ted, Tiernan plays a young priest whose suicide attempt is foiled by Ted at a festival named "It's Great Being a Priest '98". He is later cured of depression by the "Theme from Shaft", but subsequently relapses after overhearing the Radiohead song "Exit Music (For a Film)".

In the 1999 Channel 4 sitcom Small Potatoes, Tiernan took the lead role of Ed Blewitt, an underachiever who works in an east London video rental shop. It ran for 13 episodes over 2 seasons, ending in 2001.

In 2008, Tiernan and Hector Ó hEochagáin formed as a radio duo on The Tommy and Hector Show on i102-104FM after hinting at a desire to be on the radio, months before on The Late Late Show. Speaking about his role, Tiernan said, "I've always wanted to have loads of craic on the radio. What better way to have a mountain of devilment than to do a show with my best friend." Following the success of their show on iRadio Northwest, the show moved to the nationwide slot of Saturday 10am-12pm on 2FM.

In 2013, Tiernan performed in Vicar Street, Dublin, for his 200th show, in front of an audience of 1,000 people.

To date Tiernan has eight stand-up comedy DVDs: Tommy Tiernan Live, Cracked, Loose, Jokerman: Tommy Tiernan in America, Ok Baby, Bovinity, Crooked Man and Stray Sod.

On 5 January 2017, Tiernan presented the first episode of The Tommy Tiernan Show on RTÉ One.

Tiernan has starred as Da Gerry in the hit sitcom Derry Girls since 2018.

Since September 2020, he is presenter of the Tommy and Hector Podcast with Laurita Blewitt.

Comic style
When Tiernan started out, he wanted to be like Lenny Bruce. However, unlike Bruce, he does not regard himself as being a comedian "with a message". He had admitted that his sense of humour is controversial, but claims that it is based on instinct and denies there is any malice in it.

Controversies

Down syndrome
In 2007, some families of people with Down syndrome complained about a routine in Tiernan's act about people with the condition. It had caused some surprise to some of the families as he previously ran a marathon in support of Down Syndrome Ireland.

The Late Late Show
An appearance on The Late Late Show in 2008 led to complaints about Tiernan's jokes involving a methadone user, Eastern European immigrant accents, buying a motorbike from an injured biker, and a film idea about "gay Traveller spacemen" seeking a cure for gayness, eight of which were upheld by the Broadcasting Complaints Commission. Some of his previous routines which went largely without remark included a comic reference to disproportionate American reaction to 9/11 and the indifferent Israeli attitude to foreign criticism of their occupations of surrounding land.

Holocaust remarks
In September 2009, while being interviewed by Olaf Tyaransen for Hot Press magazine at a pre-performance Q&A session at Electric Picnic in County Laois, Tiernan was asked by an audience member if he had ever been accused of antisemitism. He responded by making remarks about the Holocaust and Jews and the death of Christ. He stated that a comedian should not be looked to for political correctness and said, "These Jews, these fucking Jew cunts come up to me. Fucking Christ-killing bastards. Fucking six million? I would have got 10 or 12 million out of that. No fucking problem! Fuck them." He later suggested in several interviews that his points were intended as a commentary on how somebody's words can easily be taken out of context when a small segment of a dialogue is quoted. The response of the audience was criticised as "disappointing" by Fine Gael's Alan Shatter, who also said, "I would regard it as particularly sad that people found that sort of outburst in any way amusing." Tiernan later released a statement that said he had not meant to cause offence and that his words had been taken out of context. He said that the comments were part of an attempt to explain his belief that comedians have a duty to be "irresponsible and reckless", to allow "whatever lunacy is within you to come out", and that they should never be taken out of context. He added that the statements that had caused controversy had been preceded by a statement not to take the rant seriously.

Catholic Archbishop Diarmuid Martin criticised the remarks, describing them as "offensive to the Jewish community" and "offensive to all who feel revulsion concerning the Holocaust, one of the most horrific events in human history". He said, "I can only decry the comments as insensitive and hurtful to the suffering of the victims and to a memory which is sacred." Holocaust Education Trust Ireland condemned Tiernan's statements as "appalling". Labour's Ruairi Quinn, chairman of the Trust, said that "as someone in the public eye, he has to take responsibility for his racist comments. We are equally concerned about the report of the audience's reaction, which appears to have endorsed, sustained and enjoyed his comments. We would hope that the Irish public will choose to stay away from such racist 'entertainment' in future". The Trust also said it "utterly condemns Mr Tiernan's anti-Semitic outburst and calls upon him to repudiate completely and apologise unreservedly for the comments about the Holocaust and the Jews he is reported to have made" and "This incident highlights the necessity and relevance of the role of Holocaust education in order to educate and inform people in Ireland about the Holocaust, intolerance and anti-Semitism." Louis Lentin said Tiernan should be denied a visa for his shows in the U.S. in October. Lentin said Tiernan's Electric Picnic comments were "disgraceful", and "extraordinarily racist." "He doesn't realise what he has said. He doesn't realise the seriousness of it. You can't make a joke about the Holocaust and just because you say it is a joke does not make it funny or acceptable".

Rabbi and comedian Bob Alper said that Tiernan's statement on the subject was an attempt to "weasel out" of the situation. He said of Tiernan's claim that comedians have a duty to be irresponsible, "To me that's really stupid. I don't think that comedians should be reckless or irresponsible. Comedians should be concerned about the feelings of other human beings. It's hurtful. Comedians in America don't do anti-semitic things. I've rarely heard of it. There are plenty of tasteless comedians out there but none of them pick on a group of people." He also did not consider Tiernan's statement to be an apology, suggesting that Tiernan should say the words "I'm sorry". Hot Press editor Niall Stokes defended Tiernan: "To interpret it as anti-Semitism is wrongheaded in the extreme. The way I see it, he is satirising anti-Semitism, while making a more general point that we should all be able to laugh at ourselves." Tyaransen, writing later in The Herald, wrote that neither he nor Tiernan had anticipated the response to Tiernan's comments. He said the last question asked from the floor about a "dogged charge of anti-Semitism" led to the comments, and part of Tiernan's response recounted criticism of his routine by a Jewish couple after a show in New York City. Tyaransen said that Tiernan's comments had been taken out of context and that he personally saw the monologue as "very funny".

Filmography

Film

Television

Music videos

Personal life
Tiernan married Yvonne McMahon, his partner and manager, on 9 August 2009 in County Monaghan; they had been together since December 2002.

Awards
In 1996, Tiernan won the Channel 4 "So You Think You're Funny" award. Two years later he was awarded the Perrier Comedy Award at the 1998 Edinburgh Festival Fringe and won the Best Stand-Up Award at the British Comedy Awards. In 2003, he won the Nokia Best of the Fest Award and the Orange People Choice Award at the Edinburgh Comedy Festival. In 2006, he won Ireland's Funniest Living Person Award at the People of the Year Awards.

References

External links

 
The Tommy and Hector Podcast with Laurita Blewitt at Acast

1969 births
Living people
Irish male comedians
Irish stand-up comedians
People educated at St Patrick's Classical School
People from County Donegal
People from County Meath
RTÉ 2fm presenters
People educated at Garbally College
Irish expatriates in England
Irish expatriates in Zambia